Maryann Mitchell (September 25, 1933 – December 28, 2002) was an American politician who served as a member of the Washington House of Representatives for the 30th district from 1991 to 1993 and 1995 to 2002.

References

1933 births
2002 deaths
Republican Party members of the Washington House of Representatives
20th-century American politicians
Women state legislators in Washington (state)
20th-century American women politicians